Aleksey Mikhailovich Basov (born 22 April 1977) is a Russian racing driver. He is a current member of the SMP Racing driver programme.

Career

Early years
Born in Kaliningrad, Basov began racing in his native Russia in 1995, finishing as runner-up in the cross championship of Moscow Oblast. His highlight was third place in the 2005 Lada Cup Russia.

Russian Circuit Racing Series and first steps in Europe
In 2007, Basov moved to the Super Production class of the Russian Circuit Racing Series, driving Honda Civic Type-R for Rostokino-Lada team. He won the category after eight race wins. Also he won the two-race 2007 European Touring Car Cup in the same Super Production class.

For the next year he moved into the main class — Touring, competing for the Red Wings team. He clinched the championship title. In 2009, he moved to the Ukrainian Touring Car Championship and won the Light category after winning six from eight races.

After two races behind the wheel of De Lorenzi Racing's Porsche 997 in the Italian GT Championship, Basov switched to Petricorse Motorsport for 2011, driving the same model of the car. He won one race, finishing twelfth at the end of the season.

For 2012 Basov moved to the Ferrari Challenge Europe, where he became a champion of the Coppa Shell category after seven wins in 16 races.

SMP Racing period
In 2013, Basov became part of the SMP Racing programme, joining their squad in the Blancpain Endurance Series. He finished 19th in the Pro-Am Cup class and 26th in the Pro Cup class. Also he raced in the Algarve round of the GTS category in the 2013 International GT Open, winning the first race of the round.

For the next year Basov switched to the GTC category of the European Le Mans Series, joining Kirill Ladygin and Luca Persiani. They won race on the Red Bull Ring. Basov also raced in the LMGTE Am class of the 2014 24 Hours of Le Mans, alongside Andrea Bertolini and Viktor Shaytar. But the race was ended, after Shaytar crashed their Ferrari 458 Italia GT2.

In 2015 Basov moved to the LMGTE Am class of the 2015 FIA World Endurance Championship, continuing with Bertolini and Shaytar. His squad won 2015 24 Hours of Le Mans in the LMGTE Am category. Also Basov's car was victorious at Nürburgring and Austin. That consistency lead to the title in the LMGTE Am class.

In 2016 raced with Shaytar in the 2016 GT3 Le Mans Cup and won the title after three race wins.

Shaytar returned to the Russian Circuit Racing Series in 2017, driving Volkswagen Polo R2 Mk5 in the Touring Light category. He ended the season tenth with three podium finishes.

Racing record

Career summary

24 Hours of Le Mans results

References

External links

1977 births
Living people
People from Korolyov, Moscow Oblast
Russian racing drivers
Russian Circuit Racing Series drivers
International GT Open drivers
Blancpain Endurance Series drivers
European Le Mans Series drivers
FIA World Endurance Championship drivers
24 Hours of Le Mans drivers
Sportspeople from Moscow Oblast
SMP Racing drivers
AF Corse drivers
Le Mans Cup drivers